Hotel Workers Rising is long-term organizing campaign, created by UNITE HERE in 2006, aimed at organizing and mobilizing hotel workers to win improvements in the workplace. Demands include higher wages, better benefits, safer workloads, and the right to unionize freely.

Issues
Workers in the hotel industry are mainly women of color and immigrant women. Often these women describe feeling "invisible"—expected to clean relentlessly without presenting a human face to hotel guests. According to the workers, this status is connected to extremely poor working conditions and unreasonable expectations.

Right to unionize
Many hotel workers are non-union, and the campaign has accused many hotels and hotel companies of intimidation and union busting.

Allies
The Hotel Workers Rising campaign has garnered the support of individuals and community organizations outside of the labor movement. John Edwards and Danny Glover have both appeared at various events endorsing the goals of the campaign. For its recent Hyatt Hurts campaign, Hotel Workers Rising has formed alliances with many different groups, including the National Organization for Women, MoveOn.org, and the National Football Players Association.

UNITE HERE has allied with LGBT rights activists creating the "Sleep With the Right People" slogan and collaborating on projects of mutual interest. The groups orchestrated a successful joint campaign (which involved a "Kiss-In" as well as a boycott) against the San Diego Grand Hyatt, whose owner Doug Manchester was a major supporter of California Proposition 8. (GOProud, a conservative gay organization, criticized the "gay left" for its "slavish loyalty to big labor".)

Employers

HEI
Hotel Workers Rising has intensified its focus on HEI Hotels & Resorts, a major hotel manager. Pressure in 2012 caused a number of universities—including Harvard, Yale, Princeton, and Brown—to divest from the company.

Workers have been protesting at an Embassy Suites hotel in Irvine, CA, owned by MassMutual, which has not allowed them unionize. In September 2012, the hotel's administrators (Cornerstone Real Estate Advisers) replaced HEI with Hostmark as the management company; workers went on strike to protest the bad conditions which, in their view, remained in place regardless of the company in charge.

References

External links

UNITE HERE and allies
UNITE HERE International Union
UNITE HERE Canada
Hotel Workers Rising
Sleep With The Right People
Hyatt Hurts

Opposed to the campaign
"Hyatt Sets Record Straight on UniteHere Campaign " — Text of a newspaper advertisement run by Hyatt, 23 July 2012
"Hyatt treats its employees fairly" — Op-Ed by Gail Smith-Howard, general manager of the Hyatt Regency Baltimore; Baltimore Sun, 10 September 2012

News
"Hotel Workers Rising - Westin Hotel Victory" in the Puget Sound Sage, 2007
 "Don't Get Caught in A Bad Hotel" — documents a Lady Gaga–inspired musical intervention at the Westin St. Francis in San Francisco
 Interview with Cleve Jones, a UNITE HERE boycott organizer; conducted by Amy B. Dean, Truthout, 17 August 2012
Joey Quits — "Hotel and Restaurant Worker Stories and News"

UNITE HERE
Change to Win Federation
Labor disputes in the United States